Barbara Caroline Scholz (August 29, 1947 – May 14, 2011) was an American philosopher of science, with a particular focus on the philosophy of cognitive science and linguistics. She taught at the University of Toledo, at the University of California, Santa Cruz, and at San Jose State University. She was a fellow of the Radcliffe Institute for Advanced Study at Harvard University in 2005–2006. From 1994 until her death in 2011, she was married to linguist Geoffrey K. Pullum.

References

1947 births
2011 deaths
American women philosophers
20th-century American philosophers
Philosophers of science
People from Troy, Ohio
Urbana University alumni
Andover Newton Theological School alumni
Ohio State University alumni
Alumni of the University of Edinburgh
University of Toledo faculty
University of California, Santa Cruz faculty
San Jose State University faculty
20th-century American women
Radcliffe fellows
Philosophers of linguistics
21st-century American women